The Alger Theater is a theatre located at 16451 East Warren Avenue in the MorningSide neighborhood of Detroit, Michigan. It is one of only two remaining intact and unchanged neighborhood theaters in the city of Detroit (the second being the Redford Theatre). It was listed on the National Register of Historic Places in 2005.

History
The Alger Theater, presumably named for Michigan governor Russell A. Alger, was built by Detroit theater developers Saul and Hattie Sloan. The Sloans leased the theater to Detroit theater magnate George Washington Trendle, and it first opened on August 22, 1935, as a neighborhood cinema. When the Alger Theater opened, it was a luxury theater, and included amenities such as sound and projection equipment, seating, and air conditioning. It continued as a movie house for forty years. However, as the surrounding neighborhood suffered socioeconomic changes, attendance began dropping off. In the mid-nineteen seventies, ownership changed hands, and the theater was used for live performances and music in addition to movies. However, the theater closed its doors in 1981. In 1984, ownership changed hands again, and the Alger was re-opened as a B-movie house. However, profits were slim, and the theater closed again in less than a year.

In 1986, the theater was purchased by Friends of the Alger Theater, a nonprofit community-based organization composed of neighborhood residents and businesses dedicated to preserving the Alger Theater. They are developing programming for the community while raising funds to refurbish and reopen the theater.

Description
The Alger sits at the corner of Warren Avenue and Outer Drive. It is constructed of structural steel faced with brick. A two-story square-plan tower structure with an instepped parapet stands at the corner, dominating the building's facade. The tower houses the theater entrance and box office. A vertical sign with the theater's name extends from the tower toward the street. Along the Warren facade, four single-story commercial spaces faced with painted yellow brick line the sidewalk; the facade of the theater proper above is set back.

On the interior of the theater, the inner and outer lobby and the balcony-less auditorium still show much of their historic finish. The auditorium is constructed of concrete block with horizontal banding in smaller concrete brick; it originally sat 1182 people but now seats 825. The stage was extended into the seating area to provide for theatrical performances. Stepped metal sconces with rounded ends adorn the walls.

An anchor for community building
Friends of the Alger Theater is a 25-year-old nonprofit organization.

The Friends were awarded historic designations for the theater on the state, federal and local levels. In March 2009, the city's Historic Designation Advisory Board unanimously voted to recommend that the City Council approve the designation. The Detroit City Council approved the formal local historic designation on Oct. 21, 2009. The state and federal designations were granted in 2005.

In order to provide cultural opportunities and build community in the surrounding neighborhoods, the Friends provide free off-campus programming including a theater arts class at local Detroit Public Schools in partnership with Matrix Theater Company and the summertime outdoor movie series, Film on the Hill, at Balduck Park on the third Saturdays of June, July and August.

In 2014, the theater was surveyed for asbestos and underwent abatement, clearing a large barrier to restoration. The group is currently raising funds for repairs to stabilize the theater, planning events and fundraising for full renovation of the 825-seat Art Moderne space.

See also
Theatre in Detroit

References

Unused buildings in Detroit
Theatres on the National Register of Historic Places in Michigan
Art Deco architecture in Michigan
Theatres in Detroit
National Register of Historic Places in Detroit
1935 establishments in Michigan
Theatres completed in 1935